The Dr. V. N. Bedekar Institute of Management Studies (BRIMS) is a school of management and finance in Thane, India.  It is part of VPM Institutes.

BRIMS was established on 3 July 1973. It was then named as Department of Management Studies.

Academics
Courses offered:
 Master in Management Studies (MMS)
 P. G. Diploma in Management (PGDM)

Autonomous courses:
 EpMBA – (Pharma / General ) 
 Certificate Programmes - Retail Mgmt; Foreign Trade, 
 Banking Insurance, Tax Mgmt; Supply Chain & Logistic
 Language Courses - German, French, Japanese, Chinese, Spanish

Infrastructure 

Library 
The Library holds a collection of books, research reports, magazines, journals and periodicals.  it was stocked with 14,342 books with subscriptions to 9,000 e-books, 23 national and 6 international journals along with 31 e-journals and 10 newspapers. The library provides database search facilities, including to the ProQuest, J-Gate and CRISIL databases.

Auditorium 
Thorale Bajirao Peshwe Sabhagruha has a seating capacity of 300. Panini Sabha Gruha hall is designed in a theatre style with tiered seating arrangement which can accommodate up to 200 students.

Recreation 
Recreation facility includes well maintained, multicuisine canteen, boys and girls common room and sports facilities like carrom, table-tennis, badminton, chess and cricket.

References 

Universities and colleges in Maharashtra
Education in Thane district
Educational institutions established in 1935
1935 establishments in India